Elaphriella cantharos is a species of sea snail, a marine gastropod mollusk, in the family Solariellidae.

Distribution
This species occurs in the following locations:
 Papua New Guinea
 Society Islands
 Solomon Islands

References

Solariellidae